Emily Berry  (born 1981) is an English poet and writer.

Emily Berry was born and raised in London and studied English literature at Leeds University, and Creative and Life Writing at Goldsmiths College. She is currently completing a PhD in Creative and Critical Writing at the University of East Anglia.

She was awarded an Eric Gregory Award in 2008. Her pamphlet Stingray Fevers was published by tall-lighthouse in 2008. Her debut collection of poems, Dear Boy (Faber & Faber, 2013), won the Hawthornden Prize, and the Forward Prize for Best First Collection. She is a contributor to The Breakfast Bible (Bloomsbury, 2013). Her second collection, entitled Stranger, Baby, was published by Faber & Faber in 2017.

In 2017, Berry succeeded Maurice Riordan as the editor of Poetry Review, the UK's most widely read poetry magazine.

In June 2018 Berry was elected Fellow of the Royal Society of Literature in its "40 Under 40" initiative.

Awards
—(2014), Hawthornden Prize for Dear Boy  
—(2014), Forward Prize for Best First Collection for Dear Boy  
—(2008), Eric Gregory Award

References

1981 births
English women poets
Living people
21st-century English poets
21st-century English women writers
Writers from London
Alumni of the University of Leeds
Alumni of Goldsmiths, University of London
Alumni of the University of East Anglia
Fellows of the Royal Society of Literature